Ronald Leslie Allen (22 April 1935 – 2006) was an English footballer who made 60 appearances in the Football League playing for Lincoln City. He played as a full back. Before joining Lincoln, he was on the books of Birmingham City for some years without playing for the first team, and his career ended because of a broken leg in December 1960.

References

1935 births
2006 deaths
Footballers from Birmingham, West Midlands
English footballers
Association football defenders
Birmingham City F.C. players
Lincoln City F.C. players
English Football League players
Place of death missing